Ivan Angelov Ivanov (born 8 December 1989) is a Bulgarian footballer who currently plays as a defender for Litex Lovech.

References

External links

1989 births
Living people
Bulgarian footballers
Association football defenders
Akademik Sofia players
OFC Sliven 2000 players
Neftochimic Burgas players
PFC Litex Lovech players
First Professional Football League (Bulgaria) players